K19 may refer to:
 K-19 (Kansas highway)
 K-19: The Widowmaker, an American historical drama film
 K19 pipe, a diatreme in Northern Alberta, Canada
 Albany Municipal Airport (Missouri)
 Keratin 19, a human protein
 , a Soviet submarine
 Symphony No. 4 (Mozart), listed K.19 in the Kochel catalogue